Komorniki may refer to the following villages in Poland:
Komorniki, the seat of Gmina Komorniki in Poznań County, Greater Poland Voivodeship (west-central Poland)
Komorniki, Legnica County in Lower Silesian Voivodeship (south-west Poland)
Komorniki, Polkowice County in Lower Silesian Voivodeship (south-west Poland)
Komorniki, Środa Śląska County in Lower Silesian Voivodeship (south-west Poland)
Komorniki, Podlaskie Voivodeship (north-east Poland)
Komorniki, Gmina Gorzkowice in Łódź Voivodeship (central Poland)
Komorniki, Gmina Wolbórz in Łódź Voivodeship (central Poland)
Komorniki, Wieluń County in Łódź Voivodeship (central Poland)
Komorniki, Lesser Poland Voivodeship (south Poland)
Komorniki, Świętokrzyskie Voivodeship (south-central Poland)
Komorniki, Masovian Voivodeship (east-central Poland)
Komorniki, Gmina Kleszczewo in Greater Poland Voivodeship (west-central Poland)
Komorniki, Opole Voivodeship (south-west Poland)
Komorniki, Strzelce County in Opole Voivodeship (south-west Poland)
Komorniki, Warmian-Masurian Voivodeship (north Poland)
Komorniki, West Pomeranian Voivodeship (north-west Poland)